Allen's, earlier A. W. Allen Limited, is an Australian brand of confectionery products produced by Nestlé. Allen's is the top brand of sugar confectionery in Australia. It is best known for Minties, a soft chewable mint-flavored confectionery, and their varieties of 'Party Mix' lollies.

History 
Allen's was founded by Alfred Weaver Allen (1870–1925), a Melbourne confectioner. Originally employed by MacRobertson's, he commenced confectionery production in 1891 at his Fitzroy confectionery shop. By 1909, Allen's was the third largest confectionery business in Melbourne, after those of MacRobertson and Abel Hoadley. It launched as a public company in 1922. It moved from an adjacent site to a vast factory built to the design of prominent Melbourne architect Joseph Plottel in South Melbourne on the banks of the Yarra River (which had formerly housed Holden's first Australian plant and Kraft Walker Foods),  in the 1950s. Its animated neon sign was a local landmark up to its demise in 1987.

Allen's abandoned chocolate production after World War II, however it became Australia's largest confectionery company. Allen's was purchased by UK-based Rothmans Holdings in 1985. Two years later it was sold to Nestlé.

Products and brands

Current

 Fantales – 
 Jaffas 
 Minties 
 Sherbies
 Milko
 Red Ripperz
 Bananas
 Classic Party Mix
 Party Mix
 Retro Party Mix
 Chew Mix
 Fruits & Cream
 Jelly Beans
 Killer Pythons
 Kool Mints
 Kool Fruits
 Snakes Alive
 Frogs Alive
 Cheekies
 Strawberries & Cream
 Pineapples
 Freckles
 All About Red
 Jungle Stretchies
 Sea Stretchies
 Milk Bottles
 Ice Pops
 Sorbet Cones
 Ripe Raspberries
 Spearmint Leaves – 
 Black Cats
 Bites Mini Chocolate Raspberries
 Bites Mini White Choc Raspberries
 Bites Mini Chocolate Black Cat
 Bites Mini Chocolate Bananas
 Oak Flavoured Milk Bottles and Oak Iced Coffee Milk Bottles
Sourz Snakes Alive
 Sourz Tangy Randoms
 Sourz Frogs Alive
 Sherbies Sour Fizz Chews

Former

 Ace chewing gum
 Cobbers
 Bursting Bees
 Butter menthols
 Cure-em-quick (later Check-em-quick)
 Irish Moss gum jubes
 Jelly Tots – First introduced in 1998, discontinued in 2004; temporarily reintroduced in 2015
 Q. T. fruit drops
 Steamrollers
 Tangy Tots
 Green Frogs – Discontinued in 2015 due to poor sales
 Kool Chocs – Discontinued in 2015
 Racing Cars
 Spearmint
 Oddfellows
 Marella Jubes – Discontinued in 2018 due to poor sales
 Grubs – Part of Allen's reduced sugar range
 Strawbs – Part of Allen's reduced sugar range
 Frog Family
 Peaches & Cream
 Drumstick
 Frosty Fruits

Adjustments to product lines 
In October 2014, Allen's reduced the size of the 'Killer Python' product in order to reduce its portion size. It shrunk from 47 grams (630kJ) to 24 grams (336kJ). The price of the snake was also adjusted accordingly.

In June 2015, the 'Spearmint Leaves' and 'Green Frogs' product lines were discontinued as they were not selling well, although 'Spearmint Leaves' were reintroduced in 2020. Spokesperson for Allen's parent company Nestlé, Margaret Stuart, has said that the 'Red Frogs' "outsell the green 10 to one".

Notes

References

External links

 

1891 establishments in Australia
Australian companies established in 1891
Products introduced in 1891
Australian brands
Australian confectionery
New Zealand confectionery
Brand name confectionery
Nestlé brands